Japy Ending is a 2014 Peruvian anthology comedy film written by Sandro Ventura, Jesús Álvarez, Fernando Ruiz & Víctor Mendevil and directed by 6 different directors. The film brings together several stories that occur in parallel, where extravagant characters will face the shocking news of a meteorite on an inevitable collision course against the planet.

Synopsis 
In a hypothetical end of the world, precisely on December 21, 2012. Several characters must accept this reality and decide what they will do during that last day, before a meteorite hits the Earth.

Cast 
The actors participating in this film are:

Production 
Principal photography began on February 8, 2013 and ended in March of the same year.

Release 
Its premiere was scheduled for January 2014, but it was delayed and was released on July 24, 2014 in Peruvian theaters.

Reception 
Japy Ending attracted 70,000 viewers a week after its premiere. It surpassed 10,000 viewers by the end of its second week of release. In its entire theatrical run, the film drew 128,000 viewers and grossed $479,081.

References

External links 

 

2014 films
2014 comedy films
Peruvian anthology films
Peruvian comedy films
Big Bang Films films
2010s Spanish-language films
2010s Peruvian films
Films set in Peru
Films shot in Peru
Films set in 2012
Apocalyptic films
Films about impact events